Mel Oliver and Space Rover on Mars is a science fiction novel by American writer  William Morrison (pseudonym of Joseph Samachson). It was published in 1954 by Gnome Press in an edition of 4,000 copies.

Plot introduction
The novel concerns the adventures of a boy and his sapient dog as they join an interplanetary circus on a voyage to Mars.

Reception
Anthony Boucher praised the novel as "the most enjoyable non-Heinlein s.f. for the young" in several years, describing Morrison's writing as "easy, lively, humorous and charming."

References

Sources

1954 American novels
1954 science fiction novels
American science fiction novels
Children's science fiction novels
Works published under a pseudonym
Novels set on Mars
Circus books
Gnome Press books